Sun and Moon Bay, also known as Riyue Bay, is located approximately  south of Wanning, Hainan, China. The Sun and Moon Bay Haimen Tourism Area is located here.

References

Bays of Hainan
Beaches of China